Open Road is a DVD release by the Canadian band Cowboy Junkies, with a bonus CD. It is a four-hour DVD/CD documentary of performances from 2001.

Track listing

DVD 
Cowboy Junkies Live from the Quebec City Summer Festival

A Documentary in Music, Ones and Zeroes

Margo and Michael Timmins Live from the Temple

An Open Conversation with Margo and Michael Timmins

Total DVD length is 2hrs, 47min

CD

References

External links 

Cowboy Junkies albums
2002 live albums
2002 video albums
Live video albums
Latent Recordings albums